Lophocampa albescens is a moth of the family Erebidae. It was described by Walter Rothschild in 1909. It is found in French Guiana, Suriname and Venezuela.

Description

Female

Head and thorax pale ochreous faintly tinged with brown, the vertex of head, patagia at base and near tips, and prothorax with black points; palpi with black mark on 2nd joint and the 3rd joint black; fore tibiae with black spot, the tarsi black except towards base, the mid tibia with black spot and the mid and hind tarsi black at extremities; abdomen yellow with lateral series of black striae, the ventral surface with small blackish spots on terminal segments. Forewing pale ochreous sparsely irrorated with small blackish spots and striae; more prominent antemedial spots below costa and above inner margin; small discoidal spots and one just beyond the cell; an obscure postmedial series of striae with more prominent spot below costa, excurved to vein 4, then incurved; a subterminal series of striae with more prominent spot at discal fold, some small spots on termen towards apex. Hindwing ochreous white.

Its wingspan is about 52 mm.

References

Opharus albescens at The Annals and Magazine of Natural History

Moths described in 1909
albescens